Timberlea—Prospect is a provincial electoral district in  Nova Scotia, Canada, that elects one member of the Nova Scotia House of Assembly. Its Member of the Legislative Assembly (MLA) since 2013 has been Iain Rankin of the Nova Scotia Liberal Party.

The district was created in 1967 from the former electoral district of Halifax West, under the name Halifax-St. Margaret's. Upon the recommendations of the 1992 Electoral Boundaries Commission report, it was renamed Timberlea-Prospect. At this same time, it lost the St. Margaret's Bay area to Chester-St. Margaret's, the Hammonds Plains, Lucasville, and Pockwock Road area to Sackville-Beaver Bank, and the Bedford area to Bedford-Fall River. In 2003, it lost the Bayside and West Dover areas to Chester-St. Margaret's. In 2013, on the recommendations of the 2012 Electoral Boundaries Commission, it lost the Stillwater Lake area to Hammonds Plains-Lucasville and a small number of streets in the Williamswood and Harrietsfield areas to Halifax Atlantic. It gained the Susies Lake and Quarrie Lake areas from Halifax Clayton Park.

Geography
Timberlea-Prospect has  of land area.

Members of the Legislative Assembly
This riding has elected the following Members of the Legislative Assembly:

Election results

1967 general election

1970 general election

1974 general election

1978 general election

1981 general election

1984 general election

1988 general election

1993 general election

1998 general election

1999 general election

2003 general election

2006 general election

2009 general election

2013 general election

|-
 
|Liberal
|Iain Rankin
|align="right"|4,471
|align="right"|51.93
|align="right"|+33.78
|-
 
|New Democratic Party
|Linda Moxsom-Skinner
|align="right"|2,230
|align="right"|25.90
|align="right"|-44.31
|-
 
|Progressive Conservative
|Dr. Bruce Pretty
|align="right"|1,608
|align="right"|18.86
|align="right"|+10.17
|-

|}

2017 general election

2021 general election

References

External links
2006 riding profile
2003 riding profile

Nova Scotia provincial electoral districts
Politics of Halifax, Nova Scotia